The 8 bore, also known as the 8 gauge, is an obsolete caliber used commonly in the 19th-century black-powder firearms.

Design
An 8 bore is a  caliber firearm. Historically it was used to fire solid projectiles from smoothbores, rifles, and partially rifled ball and shot guns, as well as shot from muzzle-loading and breech-loading shotguns. Later breech loaders were designed to fire cartridges.

History

Shot loadings
The 8 bore was a popular wildfowling calibre both in muzzleloaders and later cartridge shotguns. 8 bore cartridges were available in multiple lengths including 3-inch, 3¼-inch, 3¾-inch and 4-inch.

Solid loadings
When the Dutch established the Dutch Cape Colony in the 17th century, they soon discovered their muskets were hopelessly inadequate against local game. Within a century the most popular Boer firearm was a flintlock smoothbore musket of about 8 bore with a 5–6 foot long barrel. Early British settlers of the Cape Colony in the 18th century also found specialist firearms were required for the local game. European gunmakers responded with various long arms from the enormous (although seldom produced) 2 bore down.

By the 19th century, the giant 4 bore had been established as the standard elephant gun amongst European settlers and explorers within Africa, whilst the 8 bore was considered the standard for all other dangerous game.

In the late 19th century William W Greener conducted the most thorough research of any gunmaker into the requirements for African hunting. After extensive testing and lengthy discussions with returned hunters and adventurers, including Sir Samuel Baker, he concluded the 8 bore was the largest practical calibre required for hunting dangerous game. Additionally, due to the increased felt recoil of rifled weapons, he recommended the 8 bore as the largest calibre for a rifle, and that firearms above 8 bore be smoothbores.

The most common 8 bore cartridges used paper cases, much like shotgun shells, and true  caliber projectiles. A larger version utilising a thin brass case was also available, although it fired  projectiles, in reality making it a 7 bore.

Modern uses
In modern times, the 8 bore has uses in the mining, cement, and steel industry. It has been used to knock down overhangs in mines or quarries, break up bridging or stoppages in silos, to desist boiler tubes, and remove slag deposits from rotary kilns, by blasting away at them from a safe distance. This can be done while the kiln is in operation in some instances. Various slug loadings are in production for different industrial uses.

See also
 Gauge (bore diameter)
 6 bore
 10 bore

References

External links
 David E. Petzal, "Black Powder Behemoths", www.fieldandstream.com, retrieved 18 January 2017.

Firearms by caliber
British firearm cartridges